Fajr Rural District may refer to:
 Fajr Rural District (Gonbad-e Kavus County), Golestan province
 Fajr Rural District (Yazd County), Yazd province